Pierre Skawinski (23 December 1912 – 20 March 2009) was a French sprinter. He competed in the men's 400 metres at the 1936 Summer Olympics.

References

1912 births
2009 deaths
Athletes (track and field) at the 1936 Summer Olympics
French male sprinters
Olympic athletes of France
Sportspeople from Bordeaux